Oyak Renault Otomobil Fabrikaları or Oyak-Renault is a Turkish automotive manufacturer located in Bursa. It is co-owned by OYAK (Turkish: Ordu Yardımlaşma Kurumu, English: Army Pension Fund) and Renault. Oyak owns 49% and Renault owns 51% of the company.

History
Oyak-Renault was established in 1969 by Renault, Oyak and Yapi Kredi Bank, starting production two years later.

The company originally manufactured various Renault models for the local and international market. Currently, some models are exported up to 100 countries worldwide.

In 2018, the company produced 336,888 automobiles and 602,421 engines. In the same year, it was announced that it exported approximately 80% of its automobile production.

Operations
With an annual production capacity of 286,000 up to 360,000 units, it is the largest Renault factory outside Western Europe. The official car dealer network of Renault in Turkey is another joint venture known as MAİS A.Ş..

In addition to the automotive assembly, the plant operates its own gearbox and engine manufacturing. Currently, they are manufacturing 450 different engines, 450,000 units a year. In the three-shift operation, more than 5,900 workers are employed.

Current models

Former models

See also 
List of companies of Turkey
Bulgarrenault
MAVA-Renault

References

External links
 Oyak-Renault homepage
 Oyak corporate homepage
 Renault Corporate Site
 Association Renault Histoire (in french)

Companies based in Bursa
Car manufacturers of Turkey
Renault